The Four Visits of Samuel Wolfe is a 1934 Soviet drama film directed by Aleksandr Stolper.

Plot
Not being able to realize his invention within his own country, engineer Arrowsmith, author of the patent for ore flotation leaves for Soviet Union to work at one of the flotation plants, where he soon discovers a group of Soviet engineers conduct similar work. After some hesitation, Arrowsmith passes his invention to the plant and gets an offer to work together on the implementation of the invention.

Samuel Wolfe arrives, a spokesman for the syndicate of flotation machines who previously declined assistance to Arrowsmith for implementing his invention at his plants, offers him to sell his invention with the promise of a good life. But now Dick Arrowsmith categorically rejects Wolfe's offer and stays to work in the USSR.

Cast
 Andrei Abrikosov 
 Viktor Kulakov 
 Maksim Shtraukh

References

Bibliography 
 Rollberg, Peter. Historical Dictionary of Russian and Soviet Cinema. Scarecrow Press, 2008.

External links 
 

1934 films
1934 drama films
Soviet drama films
Russian drama films
1930s Russian-language films
Films directed by Aleksandr Stolper
Soviet black-and-white films
Russian black-and-white films